Víctor Hugo Amatti (born 20 June 1965) is a former Argentine footballer who played for clubs of Chile.

External links
 
 Víctor Hugo Amatti at playmakerstats.com (English version of ceroacero.es)

1965 births
Living people
Argentine footballers
Argentine people of Italian descent
Argentine expatriate footballers
Deportes Iquique footballers
Lota Schwager footballers
Club Deportivo Palestino footballers
Coquimbo Unido footballers
C.D. Arturo Fernández Vial footballers
Santiago Wanderers footballers
Primera B de Chile players
Chilean Primera División players
Expatriate footballers in Chile
Argentine expatriate sportspeople in Chile
Naturalized citizens of Chile
Association football forwards